Bolster is a surname. Notable people with the surname include:

Angela Bolster (1925–2005), Irish nun and writer
Charles Bolster (1894–1993), American judge
George Bolster (1877–1948), Australian politician
George S. Bolster (1913–1989), American photographer
Henry B. Bolster (1792–1859), American politician and businessman
Michael Bolster (born 1967), Irish chef
Sally Bolster, American politician
Stephanie Bolster (born 1969), Canadian poet
Warren Bolster (1947–2006), American skateboard photographer
W. Jeffrey Bolster, American historian